John Nutting may refer to:
 John Nutting (radio presenter), Australian radio presenter
 John Nutting (politician), member of the Maine Senate
 John Nutting (loyalist), loyalist throughout the American Revolution
 John D. Nutting, Congregationalist minister and founder of the Utah Gospel Mission